= Blitopertha gracilipedes =

Scientific classification
- Kingdom: Animalia
- Phylum: Arthropoda
- Class: Insecta
- Order: Coleoptera
- Suborder: Polyphaga
- Infraorder: Scarabaeiformia
- Family: Scarabaeidae
- Genus: Blitopertha
- Species: B. gracilipedes

Binomial name
- Blitopertha gracilipedes Baraud, 1990

Species of beetle

Blitopertha gracilipedes is a species of beetle of the family Scarabaeidae. It is found in Morocco.

== Description ==
Adults reach a length of about 9 mm. The head, pronotum, scutellum and underside are black and shiny, while the elytra are very shiny, light brownish-yellow with a narrow black suture. The antennae are black with a yellowish-brown club. The legs are black and the tarsi dark reddish-brown.
